Neurophyseta avertinalis is a moth in the family Crambidae described by William Schaus in 1924. It is found in Cuba.

The wingspan is about 13 mm. There a medial white line on the forewings, edged on either side with cinnamon brown. There is also a fine postmedial fuscous line, as well as small faint smoky marginal spots on the interspaces. The basal half of the hindwings is white.

References

Moths described in 1924
Musotiminae
Endemic fauna of Cuba